Auglaize Township is one of the twelve townships of Allen County, Ohio, United States. The 2010 census found 2,783 people in the township, 2,366 of whom lived in the unincorporated portions of the township.

Geography
Located in the southeastern corner of the county, it borders the following townships:
Jackson Township - north
Liberty Township, Hardin County - northeast corner
Marion Township, Hardin County - east
Roundhead Township, Hardin County - southeast corner
Wayne Township, Auglaize County - south
Union Township, Auglaize County - southwest corner
Perry Township - west
Bath Township - northwest corner

The village of Harrod is located in northern Auglaize Township, and the unincorporated community of Westminster lies in the township's west.

Name and history
Statewide, the only other Auglaize Township is located in Paulding County.

Auglaize Township was organized in 1832.

Government
The township is governed by a three-member board of trustees, who are elected in November of odd-numbered years to a four-year term beginning on the following January 1. Two are elected in the year after the presidential election and one is elected in the year before it. There is also an elected township fiscal officer, who serves a four-year term beginning on April 1 of the year after the election, which is held in November of the year before the presidential election. Vacancies in the fiscal officership or on the board of trustees are filled by the remaining trustees. The current Chairperson is T. Blain Brock II

References

External links
County website

Townships in Allen County, Ohio
1832 establishments in Ohio
Populated places established in 1832
Townships in Ohio